Didao is a district of the city of Jixi, Heilongjiang province, People's Republic of China.

Administrative divisions
There are four subdistricts and two townships in the district:

Subdistricts:
Dongxing Subdistrict, Kuangli Subdistrict, Ximei SubdistrictDatonggou Subdistrict

Townships:
Didaohe Township, Lanling Township

Notes and references 

Didao